İbrahim Akdağ (born 21 July 1991) is a Turkish professional footballer who plays as a midfielder for Kayserispor.

Professional career
Akdağ is from the youth academy of İstanbul Başakşehir and spent his early career on loan with various clubs in the lower divisions of Turkey. He joined Ümraniyespor, and in his final 2 seasons was one of the team's top scorers dispute playing midfield.

He joined Erzurumspor in 2018, and made his professional debut with them in a 0–0 Süper Lig tie with Çaykur Rizespor on 24 August 2018.

References

External links
 
 
 

1991 births
Living people
People from Fatih
Footballers from Istanbul
Turkish footballers
MKE Ankaragücü footballers
Erzurumspor footballers
Darıca Gençlerbirliği footballers
İstanbul Başakşehir F.K. players
Ümraniyespor footballers
Kayserispor footballers
Süper Lig players
TFF Second League players
Association football midfielders